Museum International is a peer-reviewed academic journal that covers research on the ethics and practices of museums and heritage organizations. It is published quarterly by Wiley-Blackwell and ICOM.

External links 
 Museum International official website
 International Council of Museums

Museology journals
Wiley-Blackwell academic journals
Quarterly journals
Multilingual journals
Publications established in 1948